Johnny E. McWilliams (born December 14, 1972) is a former American football tight end.

Early years
McWilliams prepped at Pomona High School.

College career
McWilliams played college football at the University of Southern California.

Professional career
McWilliams was selected with the 64th pick of the 3rd round of the 1996 NFL Draft by the Arizona Cardinals where he played until 1999.  In 2000, he played for the Minnesota Vikings.

1972 births
Living people
Sportspeople from Pomona, California
American football tight ends
USC Trojans football players
Arizona Cardinals players
Minnesota Vikings players